Rayat Institute of Engineering & Information Technology (RIEIT) is private college affiliated to Punjab Technical University, offering engineering courses at undergraduate and Graduate level, leading to B.Tech and M.Tech degrees. Also offers doctoral study centres. RIEIT is part of the Rayat-Bhara Group which also include Rayat Bahra University and Bahra University.

Overview 

Rayat Institute of Engineering and Information Technology was established in 2001 and offers five B.Tech. Programmes in the areas of Computer Science & Engineering, Information Technology, Electronics and Communication Engineering, Mechanical Engineering and Electrical Engineering. Subsequently, M.Tech programmes in Computer Science and Engineering, Electronics and Communication Engineering and Mechanical Engineering were added, all affiliated to the Punjab Technical University.

The RIEIT also houses a polytechnic college, leading to Diploma in engineering. In the campus B.Pharmacy program,  M.Pharma in different specialisations (viz. Pharmaceutics, Pharmacology, Pharmaceutical chemistry) are also being offered. College of Law, of education Table gives an account of various programmes being run by the Institute and their dates of introduction.

Location 

The Institute is situated within the Rayat Technology Centre of Excellence, Ropar, and is located 6 km from Ropar city on Chandigarh-Ropar-Jalandhar Highway.

Campus 

The campus is divided into zones for hostels, Main College Buildings, Administration Block, Residential Complex, etc.

Campus of Rayat Institute of Engineering and Information Technology is regarded as largest among the Privately funded Engineering Colleges in North India.
There are 8 campus of Rayat in India

Admissions 
 Admissions to Bachelor of Engineering courses are made through the:
 I. K. Gujral Punjab Technical University (for students who belongs to Punjab through PTU Central Counseling). Candidates admitted through this counseling get some advantages. 
 based on Joint Entrance Examination (Main) Score (conducted by All India Engineering Entrance Examination)
 Also available to other states or internationally.
 reservation of seats for the students of other states to be admitted through Joint Entrance Examination (Main)
 NRI students can expect best of attention to them, because of group's experiences and connections

Academics 
 Bachelor of Engineering courses (four years):
 Computer Science and Engineering
 Electrical Engineering
 Electronics and Communication Engineering
 Information Technology
 Mechanical Engineering
 Master of Engineering courses (two years):
 Computer Science and Engineering
 Electronics and Communication Engineering
 Mechanical Engineering
 Other departments
 Applied science

Department of Career Development and Placements 

The Training and Placement Department is staffed with full-time placement professionals. RIEIT support students an employment placement service though success for positions is dictated by merit. Past performance, and successes prommptfor the continued expectation of a good future.

Minerva 

Minerva is a national level annual cultural and technical symposium organized by students of the Rayat Institute of Engineering and Information Technology. Considered to be one of the biggest college festivals of North India, it attracts many students from colleges across north India. Events include quizzes, workshops, game shows, informal events, fashion show, dance show and rock night.

Alumni Association 

Rayat Old Student Association(RIEITos) is a non profit, non political organization of former graduates and former faculty members (hereafter collectively referred to as the Alumni) of RIEIT, Ropar campus.

See also
Rayat Bahra University, Greater Mohali

References

External links 

 

All India Council for Technical Education
Engineering colleges in Punjab, India
2001 establishments in Punjab, India
Educational institutions established in  2001